The Gisa Hwanguk occurred when the Westerners fell out of power after opposing the naming of a crown prince by Sukjong of Joseon. Prominent Westerner Song Si-yeol and others were executed. Shortly after, the Westerners split into Noron (Song's supporters within the Westerners) and Soron (Song's opponents within the Westerners).

Background 
In the late 17th century, the Westerners (Korean political faction) and Southerners (Korean political faction) were at odds in the political management of the ruling party. King Sukjong decided to abandon the previous system of party alliance and replace it frequently in order to stabilize his authority. In the beginning of King Sukjong's reign, the Southerners took the lead with the victory of the second Yesong. In response, the Westerners felt a sense of crisis as a political opponent of the Southerners, and the King Sukjong also had a sense of caution about the continuing rule of the Southerners. This was revealed in Hwanguk(the form of exchange party), including the Gyeongshin Hwanguk, Gisa Hwanguk, and Gapsul Hwanguk.

References

Joseon dynasty
Political history of Korea
17th century in Korea
1689 in Asia